This article lists living orders and families of birds. The links below should then lead to family accounts and hence to individual species.

The passerines (perching birds) alone account for well over 5,000 species. In total there are about 10,000 species of birds described worldwide, though one estimate of the real number places it at almost twice that.

Taxonomy is very fluid in the age of DNA analysis, so comments are made where appropriate, and all numbers are approximate. In particular see Sibley-Ahlquist taxonomy for a very different classification.

Phylogeny
Cladogram of modern bird relationships based on Jarvis, E.D. et al. (2014) with some clade names after Yuri, T. et al. (2013).

Paleognathae

The Paleognathae, or "old jaws", are one of the two superorders recognized within the taxonomic class Aves and consist of the ratites and tinamous. The ratites are mostly large and long-legged, flightless birds, lacking a keeled sternum. Traditionally, all the ratites were place in the order Struthioniformes. However, recent genetic analysis has found that the group is not monophyletic, as it is paraphyletic with respect to the tinamous, so the ostriches are classified as the only members of the order Struthioniformes and other rattites placed in other orders.

Struthioniformes

Africa; 2 species
 Struthionidae: ostrich

Notopalaeognathae

Rheiformes
South America; 2 species
 †Opisthodactylidae
 Rheidae: rheas

Casuariiformes
Australasia;  4 species
 Casuariidae: cassowaries and emu

Apterygiformes
Australasia; 5 species
 Apterygidae: kiwis

Aepyornithiformes
Madagascar
 †Aepyornithidae: elephant birds

Dinornithiformes
New Zealand
 †Megalapteryidae: upland moas
 †Dinornithidae: great moas
 †Emeidae: lesser moas

Tinamiformes
South America; 45 species
 Tinamidae: tinamous

Neognathae
Nearly all living birds belong to the superorder Neognathae or "new jaws". With their keeled sternum (breastbone), unlike the ratites, they are known as carinatae.

Galloanserae

Galliformes

Worldwide; 250 species
 †Sylviornithidae
 Megapodii
 Megapodidae: megapodes
 Craci
 Cracidae: chachalacas, curassows, and guans
 Phasiani
 Numidioidea
 Numididae: guineafowl
 Phasianoidea: pheasants and allies
 Odontophoridae: New World quail
 Phasianidae: pheasants and relatives

Gastornithiformes
 †Gastornithidae
 †Dromornithidae: mihirungs

Anseriformes
Worldwide; 150 species
 Anhimidae: screamers
 Anseranatidae: magpie-goose
 Anatidae: ducks, geese, and swans

Mirandornithes

Podicipediformes
Worldwide; 19 species
 Podicipedidae: grebes

Phoenicopteriformes
Worldwide; 6 species
 †Palaelodidae: swimming flamingos
 Phoenicopteridae: flamingos

Columbimorphae

Columbiformes
Worldwide; 300 species
 Columbidae: pigeons and doves

Pterocliformes
Africa, Europe, Asia; 16 species
 Pteroclidae: sandgrouse

Mesitornithiformes
Madagascar; 3 species
 Mesitornithidae: mesites

Cypselomorphae

Caprimulgiformes
Worldwide; 97 species
 Caprimulgidae: nightjars

Steatornithiformes 
South America; 1 species

 Steatornithidae: oilbird

Nyctibiiformes 
Americas; 7 species

 Nyctibiidae: potoos

Podargiformes 
Asia and Australasia; 14 species

 Podargidae: frogmouths

Aegotheliformes 
Australasia; 10 species

 Aegothelidae: owlet-nightjars

Apodiformes 
Worldwide; 478 species

Hemiprocnidae: treeswifts
 Apodidae: swifts
 Trochilidae: hummingbirds

Otidimorphae

Cuculiformes
Worldwide; 150 species
 Cuculidae: cuckoos and relatives

Musophagiformes
Africa; 23 species
 Musophagidae: turacos and relatives

Otidiformes
Africa and Eurasia; 27 species
 Otididae: bustards

Gruae

Opisthocomiformes
South America; 1 species
 Opisthocomidae: hoatzin

Gruiformes
Worldwide; 164 species
 Grui: cranes and allies
 Gruidae: cranes
 Aramidae: limpkin
 Psophiidae: trumpeters
 Ralli: rails and allies
 †Aptornithidae: adzebills
 Heliornithidae: finfoots
 Sarothruridae: flufftails
 Rallidae: rails and relatives

Charadriiformes
Worldwide; 350 species
 Charadrii
 Burhinidae: thick-knees and relatives
 Chionididae: sheathbills
 Pluvianellidae: Magellanic plover
 Charadriida: plover-like waders
 Pluvialidae: golden plovers
 Ibidorhynchidae: ibisbill
 Haematopodidae: oystercatchers
 Recurvirostridae: avocets and stilts
 Charadriidae: plovers and lapwings
 Scolopaci
 Jacanida: jacana-like waders
Rostratulidae: painted snipes
Pluvianidae: Egyptian plover
 Jacanidae: jacanas
 Thinocoridae: seedsnipes
Pedionomidae: plains-wanderer
 Scolopacida
 Scolopacidae: sandpipers and relatives
 Lari
 Turnicida
 Turnicidae: buttonquail
 Larida:  gulls and allies
 Glareolidae: coursers and pratincoles
 Dromadidae: crab-plover
 Stercorariidae: skuas and jaegers
 Alcidae: auks and puffins
 Laridae: gulls, skimmers and terns

Phaethontimorphae

Eurypygiformes
Neotropics and New Caledonia; 2 species
 Rhynochetidae: kagu
Eurypygidae: sunbittern

Phaethontiformes
Oceanic; 3 species
 Phaethontidae: tropicbirds

Aequornithes

Gaviiformes
North America, Eurasia; 5 species
 Gaviidae: loons

Sphenisciformes
Antarctic and southern waters; 17 species
 Spheniscidae: penguins

Procellariiformes
Pan-oceanic; 120 species
 Diomedeidae: albatrosses
 Oceanitidae: austral storm petrels
 Hydrobatidae: northern storm petrels
 Procellariidae: petrels and relatives

Ciconiiformes
Worldwide; 19 species

 Ciconiidae: storks

Suliformes
Worldwide; 59 species
 Fregatae
 Fregatidae: frigatebirds
 Sulae
 Sulidae: boobies and gannets
 Anhingidae: darters
 Phalacrocoracidae: cormorants and shags

Pelecaniformes

Worldwide; 108 species
 Threskiornithes
 Threskiornithidae: ibises and spoonbills
 Pelecani
 Scopidae: hamerkop
 Balaenicipitidae: shoebill
 Pelecanidae: pelicans
 Ardeae
 Ardeidae: herons and relatives

Afroaves

Accipitriformes

Worldwide; 260 species
 Cathartae
 Cathartidae: New World vultures
 Accipitres
 Sagittariidae: secretarybird
 Pandionidae: osprey
 Accipitridae: hawks, eagles, buzzards, harriers, kites and Old World vultures

Strigiformes
Worldwide; 250 species
 Tytonidae: barn owls
 Strigidae: true owls

Coliiformes

Sub-Saharan Africa; 6 species
 Coliidae: mousebirds

Leptosomiformes
Madagascar; 1 species
 Leptosomidae: cuckoo-roller

Trogoniformes
Sub-Saharan Africa, Americas, Asia; 35 species
 Trogonidae: trogons and quetzals

Bucerotiformes
Old World, New Guinea; 64 species
 Buceroidea
 Bucerotidae: hornbills
 Upupoidea
 Upupidae: hoopoe
 Phoeniculidae: woodhoopoes

Coraciiformes
Worldwide; 144 species
 Meropi
 Meropidae: bee-eaters
 Coracii
 Coraciidae: rollers
 Brachypteraciidae: ground rollers
 Coracii
Todidae: todies
 Momotidae: motmots
 Alcedinidae: kingfishers

Piciformes
Worldwide except Australasia; 400 species
 Galbuli
 Galbulidae: jacamars
 Bucconidae: puffbirds
 Pici
 Lybiidae: African barbets
 Megalaimidae: Asian barbets
 Ramphastidae: toucans
 Semnornithidae: toucan barbets
 Capitonidae: American barbets
 Picidae: woodpeckers
 Indicatoridae: honeyguides

Australaves

Cariamiformes
South America; 2 species
 Cariamidae: seriemas

Falconiformes
Worldwide; 60 species
 Falconidae: falcons and relatives

Psittaciformes
Pan-tropical, southern temperate zones; 330 species
 Strigopoidea
 Strigopidae: kakapo
 Nestoridae: kea and kakas
 Cacatuoidea
 Cacatuidae: cockatoos and cockatiel
 Psittacoidea
 Psittacidae: African and American parrots
 Psittaculidae: Australasian parrots 
 Psittrichasiidae: Pesquet's parrot, vasa parrots

Passeriformes

Worldwide; 6,500 species
 Acanthisitti
 Acanthisittidae: New Zealand wrens
 Tyranni: suboscines
 Eurylaimides: Old World suboscines
 Sapayoidae: sapayoa
 Calyptomenidae: Calyptomenid broadbills
 Pittidae: pittas
 Eurylaimidae: broadbills
 Philepittidae: asities
 Tyrannides: New World suboscines
 Tyrannida: bronchophones
 Pipridae: manakins
 Cotingidae: cotingas
 Oxyruncidae: sharpbills
 Onychorhynchidae: royal flycatchers and allies
 Tityridae: becards and tityras
 Pipritidae: pipriteses
 Platyrinchidae: spadebills
 Tachurididae: many-colored rush tyrants
 Rhynchocyclidae: mionectine flycatchers
 Tyrannidae: tyrant flycatchers
 Furnariida: tracheophones
 Melanopareiidae: crescent-chests
 Conopophagidae: gnateaters
 Thamnophilidae: antbirds
 Grallariidae: antpittas
 Rhinocryptidae tapaculos
 Formicariidae: ground antbirds
 Furnariidae: ovenbirds
 Passeri: oscines
 Menurides
 Atrichornithidae: scrub-birds
 Menuridae: lyrebirds
 Climacterides
 Ptilonorhynchidae: bowerbirds
 Climacteridae: Australasian treecreepers
 Meliphagides
 Maluridae: Australasian wrens
 Dasyornithidae: bristlebirds
 Pardalotidae: pardalotes
 Acanthizidae: gerygones, thornbills and allies
 Meliphagidae: honeyeaters and relatives
 Orthonychides
 Pomatostomidae: Australasian babblers
 Orthonychidae: logrunners
 Corvides
 Cinclosomatoidea
 Cinclosomatidae: quail-thrushes and jewel-babblers
 Campephagoidea
 Campephagidae: cuckoo-shrikes
 Mohouoidea
 Mohouidae: whitehead and allies
 Neosittoidea
 Neosittidae: sittellas
 Orioloidea
 Eulacestomidae: wattled ploughbills
 Psophodidae: whipbirds and quail-thrushes
 Oreoicidae: Australo-Papuan bellbirds
 Falcunculidae: crested shriketits
 Paramythiidae: painted berrypeckers
 Pteruthiidae: shrike-babblers
 Vireonidae: vireos and relatives
 Pachycephalidae: whistlers and relatives (Colluricinclidae)
 Oriolidae: Old World orioles
 Malaconotoidea
 Machaerirhynchidae: boatbills
 Artamidae: woodswallows and butcherbirds
 Rhagologidae: mottled berryhunter
 Aegithinidae: ioras
 Pityriaseidae: bristlehead
 Malaconotidae: bushshrikes and relatives
 Platysteiridae: wattle-eyes and batises
 Vangidae: vangas (Tephrodornithidae; Prionopidae)
 Corvoidea
 Rhipiduridae: fantails
 Lamproliidae: silktail, drongo fantail
 Dicruridae: drongos
 Ifritidae: blue-capped ifrits
 Melampittidae: melampittas
 Corcoracidae: Australian mudnesters
 Paradisaeidae: birds-of-paradise
 Monarchidae: monarch flycatchers
 Laniidae: shrikes
 Corvidae: jays and crows
 Passerides
 Melanocharitida
 Melanocharitidae: berrypeckers
 Cnemophilida
 Cnemophilidae: satinbirds
 Petroicida
 Petroicidae: Australasian robins
 Notiomystidae: stitchbird
 Callaeidae: wattlebirds
 Eupetida
 Picathartidae: rockfowl
 Chaetopidae: rock-jumpers
 Eupetidae: rail-babbler
 Sylviida
 Paroidea 
 Stenostiridae: fairy warblers
 Hyliotidae: hyliotas
 Remizidae: penduline tits
 Paridae: chickadees and true tits
 Alaudoidea
 Nicatoridae: nicators
 Panuridae: bearded reedling
 Alaudidae: larks
 Macrosphenidae: African warblers
 Locustelloidea 
 Cisticolidae: cisticolas and relatives
 Acrocephalidae: marsh warblers
 Pnoepygidae: pygmy wren-babblers
 Locustellidae: grass warblers
 Donacobiidae: donacobius
 Bernieridae: Malagasy warblers
 Hirundinidae: swallows and martins
 Pycnonotidae: bulbuls
 Aegithaloidea
 Phylloscopidae: leaf warblers
 Cettiidae: bush warblers (Erythrocercidae; Scotocercidae)
 Hyliidae: hylias
 Aegithalidae: bushtits
 Sylvioidea
 Sylviidae: true warblers
 Paradoxornithidae: parrotbills, fulvettas
 Zosteropidae: white-eyes
 Timaliidae: babblers and relatives
 Pellorneidae: fulvettas, ground babblers
 Leiothrichidae: laughing thrushes
 Muscicapida
 Reguloidea
 Regulidae: kinglets
 Bombycilloidea
 Elachuridae: spotted wren-babblers
 †Mohoidae: Hawaiian honeyeaters
 Ptiliogonatidae: silky-flycatchers
 Bombycillidae: waxwings
 Dulidae: palmchat
 Hypocoliidae: hypocolius
 Certhioidea
 Tichodromidae: wallcreeper
 Sittidae: nuthatches
 Certhiidae: treecreepers
 Troglodytidae: wrens
 Polioptilidae: gnatcatchers
 Muscicapoidea
 Cinclidae: dippers
 Turdidae: thrushes and relatives
 Muscicapidae: flycatchers and relatives
 Buphagidae: oxpeckers
 Mimidae: mockingbirds and thrashers
 Sturnidae: starlings and mynas (Rhabdornithidae)
 Passerida
 Promeropidae: sugarbirds
 Arcanatoridae: dapplethroat and allies
 Dicaeidae: flowerpeckers
 Nectariniidae: sunbirds
 Irenidae: fairy-bluebirds
 Chloropseidae: leafbirds
 Peucedramidae: olive warbler
 Prunellidae: accentors
 Ploceoidea
 Urocynchramidae: pink-tailed bunting
 Ploceidae: weavers and relatives
 Viduidae: whydahs and indigobirds
 Estrildidae: weaver finches
 Passerid clade
 Passeridae: Old World sparrows
 Motacillidae: wagtails and pipits
 Fringillidae: finches and relatives
 Calcariidae: longspurs, snow buntings
 Rhodinocichlidae: rosy thrush-tanagers
 Emberizidae: Old World buntings
 Passerellidae: American sparrows
 Phaenicophilidae: palm-tanager and allies
 Icteridae: New World blackbirds and New World orioles
 Teretistridae: Cuban warblers
 Parulidae: wood warblers
 Mitrospingidae
 Cardinalidae: cardinals, grosbeaks, and New World buntings
 Thraupidae: tanagers and relatives (Coerebidae)

See also
 Lists of animals
 List of chicken breeds
 List of birds by common name
 List of individual birds
 Lists by continent
 List of birds of Africa
 List of birds of Antarctica
 List of birds of Asia
 List of birds of Australia
 List of birds of Europe
 List of birds of North America
 List of birds of South America
 Lists by smaller geographic unit
 Lists of birds by region
 Extinct birds
 List of recently extinct bird species
 List of Late Quaternary prehistoric bird species
 List of fossil bird genera
 List of fictional birds

References